Owusu Afriyie Akoto (born 19 October 1949) is a Ghanaian agricultural economist and politician. He is a member of the New Patriotic Party and was Member of Parliament for the Kwadaso Constituency from 2009 to 2017. He is currently a cabinet minister in the Nana Akufo-Addo administration and serves as the Minister of Food and Agriculture of Ghana since 2017.

Early life and education
Owusu Afriyie Akoto was born to Bafuor Osei Akoto, a prominent member of the pre-independence National Liberation Movement and also a chief linguist at the Manhyia Palace. Akoto had his secondary school education at Opoku Ware School, Kumasi. He continued to the University of Ghana, Legon and graduated with a Bachelor of Science degree in agriculture. He then studied at Cambridge University, where he obtained a Master of Science in agricultural economics. He earned his Doctor of Philosophy degree at Cambridge in 1985.

Working life
Afriyie Akoto was employed by the International Coffee Organization in London, England for more than a decade. Among the positions he held were economist, senior economist, principal economist, and chief economic advisor. He also served as a consultant to the World Bank (a United Nations agency) on soft commodities—namely, cocoa, coffee, and sugar. After working for over 18 years abroad, he returned to Ghana where from 1995 to 2008 he served as the CEO of Goldcrest Commodities Limited and Plantation Resources Limited.

Political life
Afriyie Akoto first contested the Kwadaso constituency seat in 2004 and received 20 of the total votes cast by delegates. He lost to fellow political newcomer Josephine Hilda Addo, who won with 26 votes. Addo went on to win the constituency election in the 2004 general election. Afriyie Akoto again contested the 2007 constituency primary and beat the incumbent. He served two terms as the Member of Parliament for Kwadaso from 2009 to 2016. While at Parliament, Afriyie Akoto was the Deputy Ranking Member for the Committee on Food and Agriculture and Cocoa Affairs. He was succeeded by Samiu Kwadwo Nuamah when he lost the NPP parliamentary primary in 2015.

2015 parliamentary primary
In June 2015, Afriyie Akoto contested the constituency primary with the hope of securing enough votes to allow him to contest the constituency parliamentary election. Five other candidates, including Addo, a former Member of Parliament for the constituency, contested the election. The eventual winner was Nuamah, who pulled 191 of the total votes cast. Afriyie Akoto obtained 95 of the total votes. In his concession speech, Afriyie Akoto promised to work together with Nuamah to maintain the parliamentary seat and asserted that Nuamah had won the seat on merit.

Agriculture Minister
In January 2017, President Nana Akufo-Addo nominated Afriyie Akoto for the position of Minister of Food and Agriculture. He was approved the same month. During his vetting, he made it known that investors from South Africa and the United States who had visited the Afram plains, Kintampo, and other places in the country were excited about the animal rearing opportunities those places offer and had expressed interest in investing in the sector.

Vision for the Ministry
As the Minister of Food and Agriculture, Afriyie Akoto promised to increase the percentage of farmers who use improved seeds for farming, which as of June 2017 stood at eleven percent. He asserted the 85 percent of farmers still use traditional seeds, which reduce their yields. He has also made it known that the government will be collaborating with the Savanna Agricultural Research Institute and the Grains Development Board to overcome the deficit in the supply of seeds for the Planting for Food and Jobs programme.

Cabinet minister
In May 2017, President Akufo-Addo named Afriyie Akoto as one of 19 ministers who would form his cabinet. The names of the 19 ministers were submitted to the Parliament of Ghana and announced by the Speaker of the House, Rt. Hon. Prof. Mike Ocquaye. As a cabinet minister, Afriyie Akoto is part of the president's inner circle and is to aid in key decision-making activities in the country.

Personal life
Afriyie Akoto is married with seven children. He is a member of the Catholic Church of Ghana.

References

1949 births
Living people
Ghanaian MPs 2013–2017
Ghanaian MPs 2009–2013
Ghanaian economists
Agriculture ministers of Ghana
Cabinet Ministers of Ghana
New Patriotic Party politicians
Alumni of the University of Cambridge
University of Ghana alumni
People from Ashanti Region
Alumni of Opoku Ware School